Melbourne Johns (9 March 1901 – 7 August 1955) was a Welsh-born munitions factory worker who became known for having taken part in a World War II mission in France aimed at retrieving several pieces of machinery of military strategic value ahead of the German invasion.

Biography
Johns was born just outside the village of Hundleton, near Pembroke, in 1901, later attending Fishguard County School (now Ysgol Bro Gwaun). As an adult he moved to work in munition factories in England, often in Grantham. He married Catherine Williams in 1930.

Sometime soon after the start of the war, he was working at the BMARC munitions factory in Grantham. Johns volunteered to go with a team to recover very important Deep Hole Boring Machines at the Hispano-Suiza works in France, against his bosses' wishes, before the invading Germans could get hold of them. Johns and the soldiers found the factory deserted, loaded the equipment onto a lorry and drove it away. They took it back to England.

The Deep Hole Boring Machines were used for drilling the barrels of the Hispano-Suiza HS.404 20mm cannon that armed Spitfires and Hurricane fighters.

Depiction in film  
His exploits were captured in the wartime film The Foreman Went to France (re-titled as Somewhere in France in the United States), starring Tommy Trinder, Robert Morley, Gordon Jackson and Constance Cummings, with Welsh actor Clifford Evans playing Melbourne.

References

1901 births
1955 deaths
People from Fishguard
British people of World War II